Fred T. Goldberg Jr. (born October 15, 1947) is an American tax lawyer who has served in high-ranking positions in the United States Government, including holding the position of Commissioner of Internal Revenue.

Career 
Goldberg graduated from Yale University with a Bachelor's degree in 1969. After obtaining his B.A., he was a special assistant at the Office of Economic Opportunity. In 1971, he accepted a position as an Assistant Dean for Yale's Calhoun College and served as an instructor in political science and economics at Yale. He held these positions until 1973, when he completed his Juris Doctor degree at Yale Law School.

After completing his J.D., was hired as an associate with the firm Latham, Watkins, and Hills. He was named as a partner in the firm in 1981. He served with the firm until 1984.

From 1982 to 1986, Goldberg served at the Internal Revenue Service:
Assistant to the Commissioner of the Internal Revenue Service (1981–1982)
Acting Director of the Legislation and Regulations Division, Office of the Chief Counsel, Internal Revenue Service (1982)
Chief Counsel for the Internal Revenue Service (1984–1986)

In 1989, Goldberg was selected to be the Commissioner of the IRS. He held that position until 1992, when he was chosen as Assistant Secretary for Tax Policy in the United States Department of the Treasury. He currently resides in Bethesda, Maryland with his family and is a partner in the office of Skadden, Arps, Slate, Meagher & Flom.

Interactions with Scientology 
Allegedly, Scientology officials, including Church leader David Miscavige arrived at his office without an appointment one day to petition for relief.  The meeting was not listed on Goldberg's appointment calendar, which was obtained by The New York Times through the Freedom of Information Act (FOIA).

While details are not known, it was under Goldberg's administration that the long running IRS/Scientology legal conflict ended, though it took two years (under two other Commissioners) to work out the details.  Scientology received a unique tax exemption in 1993 and the IRS has refused to release the agreement, even after a FOIA request by The New York Times and when requested by the court in the Sklar case. (A draft version of the agreement was leaked to the WSJ and published late in 1997.)

In early 2002, Judge Silverman, of the United States Court of Appeals for the Ninth Circuit wrote the following:

If the IRS does, in fact, give preferential treatment to members of the Church of Scientology—allowing them a special right to claim deductions that are contrary to law and rightly disallowed to everybody else—then the proper course of action is a lawsuit to stop that policy. The remedy is not to require the IRS to let others claim the improper deduction, too.

References

External links 

Biography on Skadden, Arps web site

1947 births
Living people
Commissioners of Internal Revenue
People from Bethesda, Maryland
Yale Law School alumni
Scientology
Tax lawyers
Skadden, Arps, Slate, Meagher & Flom people
People associated with Latham & Watkins